Martina Colmegna (born 10 December 1996) is an Italian tennis player.

She has career-high WTA rankings of 347 in singles, achieved in 27 February 2023, and 185 in doubles, set on 17 June 2019. Colmegna has won four singles and 18 doubles titles on the ITF Women's Circuit.

Her biggest title she realized in Brescia, at a $50k event, partnering Deborah Chiesa. They defeated Cindy Burger and Stephanie Vogt in the final, in three sets.

ITF finals

Singles: 9 (4 titles, 5 runner-ups)

Doubles: 30 (18 titles, 12 runner–ups)

Notes

References

External links
 
 

1996 births
Living people
Italian female tennis players
21st-century Italian women